Shote Galica (10 November 1895 – 1 July 1927), born as Qerime Radisheva, was a Kachak Albanian insurgent. She has been declared a People's Heroine of Albania.

Biography
She was born in Radisheve village of Drenica region in Kosovo which was then part of the Ottoman Empire. She was the sister of 6 brothers. She married Azem Galica in 1915. In 1919 Shote took part, in the Uprising of Dukagjin and in Junik in 1921–23. In 1925 after the death of her husband, Azem Galica, She took over as a head of his band and fought together with Bajram Curri in Has of Prizren and Lumë. She is remembered for having captured a Serb military commander and a number of soldiers at Çikatova, in July 1927, she withdrew to Albania and spend her final months in Fushë-Kruja, where she died at the age of 31. Shote Galica was a virtual legend in her time. She is remembered for the saying Life without knowledge is like a war without weapons.

The Albanian people honor Galica for defending the national cause, celebrating her as a marty of the nation.

Family 
In July 1924 she took part in the battle for Drenica (Arbania e Vogël, Little Albania). In July 1925 after the death of her husband Azem Galica, she continued to fight and lead Albanian warriors of Kosovo. Along with hundreds of fighters from the former Kosovo Vilayet in December 1924, interventionist armies fought against Royal Yugoslav forces.

See also
Kachaks

References

1895 births
1927 deaths
Heroes of Albania
Kosovo Albanians
Military personnel from Skenderaj
20th-century Albanian military personnel
People from Kosovo vilayet